Mr Joshua Smith, also known as Portrait of an Artist (Joshua Smith), is a 1943 painting by Australian artist William Dobell. The painting is a portrait of Joshua Smith, an artist and friend of Dobell. The painting was awarded the Archibald Prize in 1943.  The painting took a modernist approach to portraiture; a break with the realism favoured to that date by Archibald Prize entrants.

The modernist painting attracted vehement criticism and equally passionate praise. The controversy spilled over from the arts world to the general public, with the Art Gallery of New South Wales having to extend opening hours and later prolong the exhibition. Over 140,000 people viewed the portrait during the exhibition  - 10% of Sydney's population at the time.

This award was contested in the Supreme Court of New South Wales by Mary Edwell-Burke and Joseph Wolinski on the grounds that the painting was not a portrait but rather a caricature. The case was lost and the award stood. The case was said to have "placed art on trial" and to have raised "questions of what constituted a portrait and what was the relationship of realism to art in general."

Smith himself was hurt by the depiction and by the controversy associated with the portrait. In 1990 Smith called the portrait "a curse, a phantom that haunts me. It has torn at me every day of my life."

Dobell sold the painting to Sir Edward Hayward, a businessman from South Australia. In 1952, the painting was damaged in a fire at the Hayward's home. Dobell himself declined to restore the work. In 1972, Kenneth Malcolm, conservator at the National Gallery in London, undertook a restoration. Malcolm worked from a black and white photograph of the original and the extent of the damage required significant repainting. This restoration created further controversy as some questioned if the portrait could still be considered a work by Dobell.

Brett Whiteley's 1978 Archibald Prize winning work Art, Life and the other thing includes a self-portrait of Whiteley holding a copy of Dobell's painting.

References

1943 paintings
Paintings by William Dobell
Portraits by Australian artists
20th-century portraits
Archibald Prize